Ringo no Uta may refer to: 

 "Ringo no Uta" (song), the first hit song in Japan after World War II
 "Ringo no Uta" (Ringo Sheena song), a 2003 song